Terrance "Quez" Watkins (born June 9, 1998) is an American football wide receiver for the Philadelphia Eagles of the National Football League (NFL). He played college football at Southern Miss and was drafted by the Eagles in the sixth round of the 2020 NFL Draft.

Early life and high school
Watkins grew up in Athens, Alabama, and attended Athens High School. During his junior season, he returned a punt and kickoff for touchdowns in the first two games. As a senior, he was named second team 6A All-State after catching 44 passes for 847 yards and 12 touchdowns. He committed to play college football at Southern Miss over offers from Georgia Southern, Middle Tennessee State, Western Kentucky and Samford.

College career
Watkins redshirted his true freshman season. The following year he finished with 23 receptions for 337 yards and two touchdowns. As a redshirt sophomore Watkins led the Golden Eagles with 72 receptions, 889 receiving yards and nine touchdown catches and was named First team All-Conference USA. Watkins was again a first team All-Conference USA selection as a redshirt junior after catching 64 passes for 1,178 yards and six touchdowns despite missing the first two games of the season due to a suspension. Watkins announced that he would forgo his final season of NCAA eligibility to enter the 2020 NFL Draft.

Professional career

Watkins was drafted by the Philadelphia Eagles in the sixth round with the 200th overall pick of the 2020 NFL Draft. He was placed on injured reserve on September 6, 2020. He was designated to return from injured reserve on September 29, and began practicing with the team again. He was activated on October 10.
In Week 15 against the Arizona Cardinals, Watkins caught three passes for 40 yards and his first career touchdown reception during the 33–26 loss.

Watkins established himself early on in the 2021 season as the wide receiver two for the Eagles. He was placed on the COVID list on December 13, 2021.  Watkins had a solid year in 2021, ending the campaign with 43 catches for 647 yards and 1 touchdown.

In 2022, the Eagles reached Super Bowl LVII agains the Kansas City Chiefs.  In Super Bowl LVII, Watkins had 1 catch for 8 yards. During the third quarter with the Eagles up by 3 points, and at the Kansas City 42 yard-line, Watkins dropped a pass that would have put the Eagles inside of the ten yard-line. The Eagles ended up opting for a field goal, which extended their lead to six points. However, the Eagles went on to lose the game by a score of 38-35.

Career statistics

Regular season

Playoffs

References

External links
Philadelphia Eagles bio
Southern Miss Golden Eagles bio

1998 births
Living people
Players of American football from Alabama
People from Athens, Alabama
American football wide receivers
Southern Miss Golden Eagles football players
Philadelphia Eagles players